Taarak Mehta Ka Ooltah Chashmah abbreviated as TMKOC is an Indian sitcom based on the weekly column "Duniya Ne Undha Chasma" by Taarak Mehta in Chitralekha magazine. It is produced by Asit Kumar Modi. It premiered on 28 July 2008 and airs on Sony SAB and is also digitally available on SonyLIV. The show holds the Guinness World Record for the longest-running Indian daily sitcom on television by episode count.

Premise 

The series takes place at the Gokuldham Co-operative Housing Society, an apartment complex in Powder Gali, Film City Road, Goregaon East, Mumbai, and focuses on the members of Gokuldham Society who come from different backgrounds.

Gokuldham is also referred to as "Mini India" in the show.
The residents of Gokuldham are shown facing many problems and finding solutions for those problems. The show also occasionally highlights social issues. Most of the episodes are based on Jethalal being stuck in a problem and Taarak Mehta, his best friend, whom he calls his "Fire Brigade", rescues him. Society Members live like a family and help each other in their problems, to promote unity in diversity. The members of Gokuldham celebrate all the festivals and organise various events too.

Cast and characters

Main 
 Dilip Joshi as Jethalal "Jetha/Jethiya" Champaklal Gada: Champakalal's son; Daya's husband; Tipendra's father;Taarak Mehta's best friend; A Kutchi Gujarati Jain from Bhachau, Gujarat, he is less educated yet a successful businessman who runs a electronic shop called "Gada Electronics". (2008–present)
 Disha Vakani as Daya Jethalal Gada: Jethalal's wife; Champklal's daughter-in-law; Tipendra's mother; Sundar's sister and Jeevdayaben's daughter. She is from Ahmedabad, Gujarat. She is known as "Garba Queen". (2008–2018;  2019)
 Bhavya Gandhi as Tipendra "Tapu" Jethalal Gada: Jethalal and Daya's son; Tapu sena's leader; Champaklal's grandson. (2008–2017)
 Raj Anadkat replaced Gandhi as Tipendra: He is now studying at college. (2017–2022)
Nitish Bhaluni replaced Anadkat as Tipendra. (2023–present)
 Amit Bhatt as 
Champaklal Jayantilal Gada: Jethalal's father; Daya's father-in-law and Tapu's grandfather. He is from Bhachau (Kutch), Gujarat. He often teaches Jetha and the other society members various morals and lessons. (2008–present).
Jayantilal Girdharlal Gada: Champaklal's father. (2021)
 Shailesh Lodha as Taarak Mehta: The narrator of the show who is a writer and poet by profession; Jethalal's best-friend; Jethalal refers Metha as his 'Fire Brigade'; Anjali's husband. He is frustrated with his boss and his wife Anjali's diet food. (2008–2022)
Sachin Shroff replaced Shailesh Lodha as Taarak. (2022–present)
 Neha Mehta as Anjali Taarak Mehta aka ATM: Taarak's wife. She is a dietitian (2008–2020)
 Sunayana Fozdar replaced Neha Mehta as Anjali. (2020–present)
 Tanuj Mahashabde as Krishnan Subramaniam Iyer: A scientist from Chennai, Tamil Nadu and also treasurer of Gokuldham society. Babita's husband. He has friendly rivalry relation with Jethalal. (2008–present)
 Munmun Dutta as Babita Krishnan Iyer: Iyer's wife; Jethalal's secret crush; she was a model in the film industry who hails from Kolkata, West Bengal and had a love-marriage with Iyer. (2008–present)
 Mandar Chandwadkar as Aatmaram Tukaram Bhide: A tuition teacher from Ratnagiri, Maharashtra; He is Gokuldham society's one and only Secretary; Madhavi's husband; Sonalika's father. (2008–present)
 Sonalika Joshi as Madhavi "Madhu" Aatmaram Bhide: Aatmaram's wife; Sonalika's mother. A businesswoman who makes pickle and papad. (2008–present)
 Jheel Mehta as Sonalika "Sonu" Aatmaram Bhide. (2008–2012): Aatmaram and Madhavi's daughter.
 Nidhi Bhanushali replaced Jheel Mehta. (2012–2019)
 Palak Sindhwani replaced Nidhi Bhanushali: She is now in college. (2019–present)
 Nirmal Soni as 
 Dr. Hansraj Baldevraj Hathi : An overweight doctor from North India; Komal's husband; Gulabkumar's father. Loves to eat food. His catchphrase is sahi baat hai. (2008–2009; 2018–present)
 Kavi Kumar Azad replaced Nirmal Soni as Dr. Hathi. (2009–2018) and Soni returned as Hathi due to Azad's death.
 Dr. Vanraj Hathi: Dr. Hathi's younger brother. (2009–2011)
 Ambika Ranjankar as Komal "Komu" Hansraj Hathi: Dr. Hathi's wife; Gulabkumar's mother. Often assists her husband. Her catchphrase is Ooh come on. (2008–present)
 Kush Shah as Gulabkumar "Goli" Hansraj Hathi: Hansraj and Komal's son. (2008–present)
 Gurucharan Singh as Roshan Singh Harjeet Singh Sodhi: A mechanical engineer who owns a car garage. He is very strong and hails from Jalandhar, Punjab. His Parsi wife is also named Roshan. He likes to do party and drink which often ends up getting caught by ladies and Champaklal. He is always romantic with his wife. His catchphrase is "Use Te Main Chhaddanga Nahin" (I won't spare him) whenever he finds society members in trouble. (2008–2013; 2014–2020)
 Laad Singh Maan replaced Gurucharan Singh as Sodhi (2013–2014) and Gurucharan Singh returned as Sodhi.
 Balwinder Singh Suri replaced Gurucharan Singh as Sodhi. (2020–present)/ Sodhi's friend Balvinder "Ballu" Singh Suri. (2019)
 Jennifer Mistry Bansiwal as Roshan Daruwala Kaur Sodhi: Roshan Singh's wife; Gurucharan's mother. She is a Parsi woman, who had a love-marriage with Roshan Singh. (2008–2013,2016–present)
 Dilkhush Reporter replaced Jennifer as Roshan but later returned in 2016. (2013-2016) 
 Samay Shah as Gurcharan "Gogi" Singh Roshan Singh Sodhi: Roshan Singh and Roshan Kaur's only son and the youngest member of Tapu Sena. (2008–present)
 Shyam Pathak as Patrakaar Popatlal "Popu/Popat" Bhagwatiprasad Pandey: Originating from Bhopal, Madhya Pradesh, he works as a senior crime reporter and digital edition head in the Toofan Express newspaper. (2009–present).
 Sharad Sankla as Abdul Nawab Miyaa: Owner of a grocery shop All In One General Store. (2008–present)
 Azhar Shaikh as Pankaj "Pinku" Diwan Sahay: Oldest member of Tapu Sena, who initially lived in Gokuldham Society but later shifted to the neighbouring Gulmohar Society. His parents Mr. Diwan and Mrs. Dipika Sahay are agents in RAW and were deployed overseas for many years. (2008–present)
 Ghanashyam Nayak as Natwarlal "Nattu" Prabhashankar Undhaiwala: Hailing from Undhai Village, Gujarat, Nattu is Jethalal's employee who handles the accounts section of Gada Electronics.  Whenever Jethalal assigns him some unwanted work, he pretends to not have heard and shouts, "Hain! Aapne mujhe kuch kaha kya?" (Sorry! Did you say something to me?). He often irritates Jethalal by doing unwanted work and flaunting his English-speaking skills, though he is very loyal and hardworking. He fondly calls his wife Mangalagauri as "Mangoo". (2008–2021)
 Kiran Bhatt replaced Nayak as Natwarlal after his death. (2022–present)
 Tanmay Vekaria as Bagheshwar "Bagha" Undhaiwala: Nattu's nephew; Bawri's fiancé and Jetha's employee. (2011–present)

Recurring 
 Mayur Vakani as Sundar Lal: Daya's brother. He often creates problems for his brother-in-law Jethalal, and schemes to take money from him. He is very dear to his sister, Daya, who affectionately calls him "Sundar Vira" (younger brother in Gujarati) (2008–present)
 Daya Shankar Pandey as Inspector Chalu Pandey: A police officer in Maharashtra police from Uttar Pradesh background. He dislikes society members solving cases themselves, leaving him no chance to be credited for solving even a single case. He fears his wife Basundi. He has a catchphrase, "Hamara Naam Hai Inspector Chalu Pandey Jhuth Bologe Toh Padenge Dande" (My name is Inspector Chalu Pandey and if you dare to lie then I will not leave you through my stick) (2010–present)
 Monika Bhadoriya as Bawri Dhondulal Kanpuria: Bagha's fiancée and love interest. She often forgets names, except Bagha, and causes trouble for Jethalal in the shop. She has a catchphrase, "Haye Haye Galti Se Mistake Ho Gayi" (Oh God, I made a mistake by mistake)(2013–2019)
 Navina Wadekar replaced Bhadoriya as Bawri (2023–present)
 Yash Patel as Magan, a worker at Gada Electronics. (2008–present)
 Kanti Joshi as Baka: Sundar's friend. He has a catchphrase in the Gujarati language "Kem Palty" (How are you?) and often chews paan which irritates Jetha. (2010–present)
 Jatin Bajaj as Bhailu: Sundar's friend. (2014–present)
 Rakesh Bedi as Babulal: Taarak's short-tempered and arrogant boss who often asks Mehta to do his personal works too. (2020–present)
 Priya Ahuja as Reporter Rita Shrivastav. (2008; 2009–2010; 2013–2022): A reporter in Kal Tak News channel who is rival of Popatlal.
 Nidhi Nautiyal replaced Ahuja as Reporter Rita Shrivastav. (2010–2013). Priya Ahuja was again cast in the role after Nautiyal left the show in 2013.
 Anil Yadav as Matka King Mohanlal (2008–2009)
 Kamal Ghimiray as Shubhankar Banerjee: Iyer's boss from Bengali background (2019–present)

Guest 
 Harshad Joshi as Himself and various other characters
 Malav Suresh Rajda as Himself and various other characters
 Surbhi Chandna as Sweety: former salesgirl at Gada Electronics who later claimed to be Jethalal's girlfriend to extort money from him however got exposed by Tapu. (2008)
 Kari Irwin Otteburn as Kerry: Jetha's namesake sister from London and Popatlal's former love interest. But she married someone else. (2009)
 Ayushmann Khurrana as himself (2009)
Raju Kher as Mr. Chandi Ramani, owner of costliest apartment of society (2010)
Rishi Kapoor as himself (2010)
Neetu Singh Kapoor as herself (2010)
Asma Siddiqui as Koyal: Anjali's mischievous sister studying journalism, Popat's former love interest (2010)
Nilesh Divekar as Gaffur Ghisela. A vasooli man who comes for Vasooling Gold Money from Bhide.(2010)
Deepesh Bhan as Rahul (Goli's cousin)/ Lawyer Pyare Mohan (Gulabo's husband, Jetha's defence lawyer in Gulabo's case) (2010, 2012, 2015)
Yashpal Sharma as Don Kuldeep Singh Rana (2011)
Saroj Khan as herself/judge for Society's Disco Night Dance Competition (2012)
Kareena Kapoor Khan as herself (2012)
Sharman Joshi as himself (2009, 2012)
Khushboo Tawde as Bulbul: Popat's former love interest. (2013)
Tapasya Nayak Srivastava as Bharti (2013)
Hrithik Roshan as himself to promote Krrish 3 (2013)
Simple Kaul as Gulabo: Mohan Pyaare's wife; Jethalal's namesake sister. A girl from Matkunda village, Pauri Garhwal district, Uttarakhand who claimed to be Jetha's first wife but lost case after getting exposed and married Jetha's defence lawyer Mohan Pyaare. (2012–2013)
 Aradhana Sharma as Deepti, a room service lady who is also a spy of the main boss in Mission Kala Kauwa. (2021)
Shivaji Satam as A.C.P. Pradyuman from CID (2014)
Aditya Srivastava as Inspector Abhijeet from CID (2014)
Dayanand Shetty as Inspector Daya from CID (2014)
Dinesh Phadnis as Inspector Fredricks/Freddy from CID (2014)
Janvi Chheda as Sub-Inspector Shreya from CID (2014)
Gaurav Khanna as Inspector Kavin from CID (2014)
Amitabh Bachchan as himself (2014,2021)
Nigaar Khan as Sophia (2014)
Boman Irani as himself (2012, 2014)
 Priyanshu Singh as Inspector Kiran Sharma (2014)
Tanaya Gupta as Minty/Sapna: A con girl who came to marry and loot Popatlal, but repented. (2015)
 Pratish Vora as Mukadam Babu Bhai: who renovated internals of apartments (2015)
Ganesh Acharya as himself (2015)
 Deepika Padukone as herself (2014, 2015)
 Atisha Naik as Mangu Tai (2017)
 Mahira Sharma as Ekta (Anjali's sister) (2014)/ Host of Ganesh Chaturthi Mahotsav (2017)
 Shah Rukh Khan as himself (2013, 2014, 2015, 2017)
Manisha Yadav as Ratnavali: Babita's friend who uses ratnas to test love however proved to be a troublemaker for Jetha  (2017)
Salman Khan as himself (2011, 2015, 2017)
Ranveer Singh as himself (2019)
Ajay Devgan as himself (2009, 2012, 2013, 2016, 2017, 2020)
 Varun Dhawan as himself (2014, 2016, 2017, 2020)
Kajol as herself (2015, 2020)
Navina Bole as Dr. Monica Sharma (2017) /Dr. Sara (Babita's friend; Jetha's psychiatrist in his weird dreams track) (2020)
Deepak Pareek as Bhogilal: Jetha's greedy business associate who tried to cheat him and many other businessmen. He was later arrested by Society members' intelligence. His catchphrase was "Bhagwan Sabka Bhala Kare Par Shuruaat Mujhse Kare" (God should help everyone, but start with me.) (2021)
Kajal Pahuja as Bharti: Popat's innocent and short-tempered namesake sister who worked as junior to Popat in Toofan Express and assisted him in Mission Kaala Kauwa disguising herself under the fake identity of Chintamani with Popat disguising himself under the fake identity of Chinta's father Rajamani along with assistance of Dr. Hathi, Jethalal, Champaklal and Bagha. (2021)
 Krutika Gaikwad as Vidya; Bhide's cousin sister and Popatlal 's one sided love interest (2022)
 Pushkar Priyadarshi as Tillu: Jethalal's Kidnapper (2022)

Production and promotion 

The producers initially approached the Star Plus and Zee TV channels, to host the series, however when they rejected their offer, Sony SAB decided to accept the script. The filming for the series takes place in film city in Mumbai. External filming for specific scenes has taken place in locations, for example: Gujarat, New Delhi, Goa and in overseas locations such as London, Brussels, Paris, Hong Kong and Singapore.

On completing 1000 episodes on 6 November 2012, Asit Kumarr Modi stated that it took eight years to get the show on air:

"Originally, it was a column in a Gujarati magazine, and I bought its rights in 2001. I approached every channel, but the trend of daily soaps had just started, and saas-bahu shows dominated the scene. Whoever I approached said there was no scope for comedy every day. But I had a feeling that one-day comedies, too, would become a daily trend. Finally, in 2008, Taarak Mehta... came on the air."

In February 2015, Joshi, Vakani, and Lodha hosted the red carpet at the 60th Britannia Filmfare Awards to promote the Clean India campaign. From March to June 2020, filming shut down in the wake of the COVID-19 pandemic lockdown in India. During the same period it was revealed that it was originally planned for two years and might have gone off-air in 2010 itself as per original plan. But viewers' love made it a seamless series. The show started broadcasting its new episodes from 22 July 2020.

By 24 September 2020, the 3000th episodes had been filmed .

The series was also dubbed in Telugu as Tarak Mama Ayyo Rama for ETV Plus and Marathi as Gokuldhamchi Duniyadari for Fakt Marathi.

Reception 
In the first week of 2017, the show stood in the fourth position with 6,004 TVT ratings. In the fourth week, the show entered the top five and stood in the fifth position with 6,059 TVT ratings. In March 2017, the show remained within the top five shows urban-rural metrics. In the 25th week of 2017, the show stood at the top spot with 6,092 TVT ratings. In the 26th week of 2017, the show stood at third spot with 6,049 TVT ratings. It is the longest-running scripted show on Indian television. In the first week of 2018, the show topped the chart with 6961 TVT ratings.
In the 42nd week of 2019, the show stood at the first position with 7952 TVT ratings. In week 29 of 2020, the show emerged as number one show post-COVID-19 lockdown with 6477 TVT ratings.

Polish Deputy Prime Minister and Minister of Culture and National Heritage, Piotr Glinski visited the sets of Taarak Mehta Ka Ooltah Chashmah in February 2016.

Crossovers and special episodes 
In 2010 the cast of Khichdi made a special appearance to promote their film Khichdi: The Movie.

Also in 2010, Indira Krishnan appeared as Krishnaben to promote her show Krishnaben Khakhrawala.

Special episode "Anand Ka Safar" to pay tribute to Rajesh Khanna aired in July 2012 in which the cast members danced on Khanna's songs.

Crossover episodes with C.I.D. named Mahasangam aired in July 2014 in which CID visits Gokuldham Society to solve a murder mystery case.

Spin-off 
An animated series based on the characters of the Taarak Mehta Ka Ooltah Chashmah titled Taarak Mehta Kka Chhota Chashmah started airing on Sony Yay from 19 April 2021.

Controversies 
The show faced a controversy on 25 April 2022 in episode number 3441 where a tribute to legendary singers Lata Mangeshkar, Mohammed Rafi, Mukesh, Kishore Kumar, SP Balasubrahmanyam, Bappi Lahiri was given, it wrongly mentioned 1965 as year of Sino-Indian War and Aye Mere Watan Ke Logo song instead of 1962. However the team issued a public apology the same day hours after the broadcast of that episode by correcting their mistake.

Awards

Indian Television Academy Awards

Indian Telly Awards

Star Guild Awards

See also 

 List of Hindi comedy shows
 List of programmes broadcast by Sony SAB

References

External links 

 
 Taarak Mehta Ka Ooltah Chashmah on SonyLIV

Hindi comedy shows
Sony SAB original programming
2008 Indian television series debuts
Indian television sitcoms
Television shows set in Mumbai
2010s Indian television series
2020s Indian television series
Sikhism in fiction
Cultural depictions of Rajesh Khanna
Parsi culture